{{Infobox television
| image         = ESPN Sunday Night Baseball TV logo 2018.jpg
| image_size    = 200
| alt_name      =
| genre         = Sports telecasts
| runtime       = Variable (3 hours approximate)
| starring      = Karl Ravech (play-by-play)David Cone (analyst)Eduardo Pérez (analyst) Buster Olney (field reporter)Michael Kay (ESPN2)Alex Rodriguez (ESPN2)
| country       = United States
| language      = English
| location      = Various Major League Baseball venuesESPN Studios, Bristol, Connecticut (2020)
| network       = ESPN (1990–present)ABC (2021–present)ESPN2 (2022–present)
| first_aired   = 
| last_aired    = present
| num_seasons   = 31
| num_episodes  =
| list_episodes =
| related       = Monday Night BaseballWednesday Night Baseball
}}Sunday Night Baseball is an exclusive weekly telecast of a Major League Baseball game that airs Sunday nights at 7:00 p.m. EDT on ESPN during the regular season.

The games are preceded most weeks by the studio show Baseball Tonight: Sunday Night Countdown presented by Chevrolet prior to the first pitch. A few telecasts each season appear on ESPN2 rather than ESPN due to conflicts with other programming; however, starting in 2022, ESPN2 will also air Sunday Night Baseball with alternate commentary for eight games per season.

History
Jon Miller-Joe Morgan era (1990–2010)

The series debuted on April 15, 1990 with coverage of New York Mets against the Montreal Expos in Montreal. From its inception through 2010, the series featured the broadcast team of play-by-play commentator Jon Miller and color commentator Joe Morgan. Steve Phillips joined them for the 2009 season, and Orel Hershiser did so for the 2010 season following Phillips' dismissal by the network.

From 2004 until 2006, Sam Ryan served as the field reporter, but she left to join New York City's WCBS-TV and CBS Sports in June 2006. On July 2, 2006, Bonnie Bernstein joined the crew as the new field reporter, but did not return in 2007 primarily due to her request to cut back her schedule because of her continued recovery from a bout with deep vein thrombosis in October 2006. Beginning in 2006, Peter Gammons joined the broadcasts as a field reporter in the scouts position. Gammons, however, suffered a brain aneurysm and didn't return until September 2006.

In 2010, Miller and Morgan began their 21st consecutive season working together for ESPN. Following the 2010 season, ESPN announced that the television contracts of Miller and Morgan would not be renewed. Miller was offered, but chose to decline, a continued role with ESPN Radio.

Dan Shulman era (2011–2017)
Play-by-play announcer Dan Shulman joined color commentators Hershiser and Bobby Valentine as the new Sunday Night Baseball crew beginning in 2011. In an essential trade deal, following the hiring of Valentine as the Boston Red Sox manager, his predecessor Terry Francona was hired to join Shulman and Hershiser for the 2012 season. Francona stayed with ESPN for only one season before he was hired by the Cleveland Indians to be their manager for the 2013 season. Francona was replaced by John Kruk, who had been part of the Baseball Tonight team since 2004.

Like Miller and Morgan before them, Shulman and Hershiser also formed the lead team on ESPN Radio's World Series coverage. Prior to the 2014 season, Hershiser left ESPN to become an analyst for the Dodgers on SportsNet LA, and was replaced by Curt Schilling; however, Schilling's subsequent diagnosis of and treatment for an undisclosed form of cancer led to his being unavailable to ESPN for most of the season. Shulman and Kruk worked as a two-man booth until Schilling joined them in September.

On August 30, 2015, former softball player Jessica Mendoza joined the Sunday Night Baseball broadcast team as a color commentator.  For the 2016 MLB season, former Yankees player Aaron Boone joined Shulman and Mendoza in the broadcast booth as the second color commentator for SNB. Shulman stepped down at the conclusion of the 2017 season, while Boone left the booth after being named new Yankees manager.

Matt Vasgersian–Alex Rodriguez era (2018–2021)
On January 23, 2018, ESPN announced that Alex Rodriguez and Matt Vasgersian would join Jessica Mendoza, Buster Olney, and the SNB team for the 2018 season as analyst and play-by-play respectively. For the 2020 season abbreviated due to COVID-19, Mendoza left SNB as part of her new deal with ESPN, leaving Vasgersian and Rodriguez, who broadcast all games from a studio at ESPN's Bristol, Connecticut headquarters.

ABC televised a Sunday Night Baseball matchup between the Chicago White Sox and the Chicago Cubs on August 8, 2021. The broadcast marked ABC's first broadcast of Sunday Night Baseball and the first regular season matchup it had broadcast since its involvement in the Baseball Network in 1995.

Ravech, Cone and Pérez (2022–present)
In 2021, ESPN and Major League Baseball agreed to a new contract that would last through the 2028 season. Beginning in 2022, ESPN would keep Sunday Night Baseball as its Game of the Week broadcast, but would no longer televise non-exclusive weeknight games unlike in previous years. It also gave ESPN the option to produce an alternate telecast on its sister networks (such as the popular alternate "StatCast" seen on ESPN2), as well as simulcasts on ESPN+.

Matt Vasgersian left ESPN after the 2021 season to focus more on his duties for MLB Network and Bally Sports West, as he is the lead announcer for the Los Angeles Angels, which in part, due to SNB, saw his role taken by Daron Sutton and Rich Waltz for most of the 2021 season. On January 7, 2022, ESPN announced that Karl Ravech would become the fourth play-by-play announcer for Sunday Night Baseball, joined by analysts David Cone and Eduardo Pérez.

KayRod Cast
Starting in 2022, alternate telecasts of eight Sunday Night Baseball games will air on ESPN2 with Michael Kay and Alex Rodriguez calling the games. The presentation, nicknamed "KayRod Cast", will be similar to the Monday Night Football "Manningcast" hosted by Peyton and Eli Manning.

Notable games aired on Sunday Night Baseball

2000s
On May 28, 2000, Pedro Martínez and Roger Clemens faced off in an epic pitchers' duel at Yankee Stadium. Both pitchers threw complete games and combined for 22 strikeouts, 13 for Clemens, 9 for Martinez. The game was scoreless until Trot Nixon hit a two-run home run in the top of the ninth inning. Martinez then got the final three outs in the bottom of the inning to secure the victory.

ESPN was on hand for the Cleveland Indians' historic comeback against the Seattle Mariners on August 5, 2001. The Indians trailed 14–2 after six innings, but scored twelve runs in the final three innings before winning in the bottom of the eleventh, 15–14. The twelve-run comeback tied the Major League record for largest deficit overcome in a game.

On September 2, 2001, Mike Mussina of the New York Yankees came within one strike of a perfect game against the Boston Red Sox. The effort was broken up on a single by Carl Everett, with Mussina settling for a one-hitter. The game itself was an exciting pitchers' duel, with the Red Sox' David Cone also shutting out the Yankees for eight innings, before allowing an RBI double by Enrique Wilson in the ninth. It was the only scoring of the Yankees' 1–0 win. Additionally, Cone was the most recent pitcher to record a perfect game having done so two years earlier as a Yankee against the Montreal Expos.

On June 16, 2002, Sunday Night Baseball covered a Subway Series at Shea Stadium in which Mo Vaughn hit a game winning three-run home run in the New York Mets' 3–2 win over the New York Yankees.

Rafael Furcal completed an unassisted triple play for the Atlanta Braves against the St. Louis Cardinals on August 10, 2003. It was the 12th such play in baseball history. In the fifth inning, the shortstop caught pitcher Woody Williams' liner with the runners moving in a hit and run attempt, stepped on second base to retire catcher Mike Matheny and tagged Orlando Palmeiro before he could return to first.

On April 22, 2007, the Red Sox became the fifth team in Major League history to hit four consecutive home runs, doing so in the third inning of a 7–6 victory over the Yankees.

On April 29, 2007, a canceled broadcast occurred between the Chicago Cubs and St. Louis Cardinals when Cardinals relief pitcher Josh Hancock was killed in a car accident earlier in the day at 12:35 A.M. while driving under the influence. In place of the game, special programming hosted by Miller and Morgan was shown. The game was later made up on September 10, 2007, where the Cubs defeated the Cardinals 12–3, though the game was not broadcast as the Game of the Week.

On August 5, 2007, Tom Glavine of the New York Mets became the 23rd pitcher in history to record his 300th win. He did it in an 8–3 victory over the Chicago Cubs.Sunday Night Baseball broadcast the Washington Nationals' very first game at Nationals Park on March 30, 2008. The Nationals beat the Atlanta Braves, 3–2, on Ryan Zimmerman's walk-off home run in the bottom of the ninth. President George W. Bush, who threw out the ceremonial first pitch prior to the game, joined Jon Miller and Joe Morgan in the ESPN booth during the telecast.

The final game played at Yankee Stadium on September 21, 2008, pitting the New York Yankees against the Baltimore Orioles, was broadcast on Sunday Night Baseball.

The Mariano Rivera 500th career save (and also his 1st lifetime RBI) was broadcast on Sunday Night Baseball from Citi Field (home of the New York Mets).

2010s
During the May 1, 2011, broadcast between the New York Mets and Philadelphia Phillies, ESPN announced the death of Osama bin Laden, the mastermind of the September 11 attacks, at the end of the 8th inning. At the top of the 9th inning with 1 out and Daniel Murphy at bat, fans at Citizens Bank Park erupted with U-S-A! chants despite the fact that no announcement of the news had been made in the stadium. Fans learned about the events through social media and mobile news apps. Appropriately, the Mets game against the Chicago Cubs on September 11 was a Sunday night game to mark the tenth anniversary of the attacks.

On July 17, 2011, a game between the Boston Red Sox and Tampa Bay Rays went scoreless into the 16th inning before the Red Sox scored in the top of the inning, leading to a 1–0 victory. This game was also notable for a foul ball hit by the Rays' Sean Rodriguez that hit and broke a lamp in the catwalks of Tropicana Field. As the grounds crew cleaned up the broken glass that fell onto the field, the stadium PA system played the music from The Natural.

The Chicago Cubs and the Mets at Citi Field on September 11, 2011, was broadcast on Sunday Night Baseball as part of the 10th anniversary of September 11, 2001; New York was targeted by the terrorists in the attacks of that day and the Mets hosted the first major professional sports event held in New York City since the attacks on September 21.

On August 30, 2015, during a game between the Chicago Cubs and the Los Angeles Dodgers, Jake Arrieta threw a no-hitter. This was the first no-hitter aired on Sunday Night Baseball. This was the first Sunday Night Baseball game to have a female commentator in the booth, Jessica Mendoza.

On July 3, 2016, Sunday Night Baseball aired the Fort Bragg Game, the first professional sporting event held on an active military base, and the first MLB regular season game held in North Carolina. The Miami Marlins defeated the Atlanta Braves, 5–2.

On May 7, 2017, during the game between the Chicago Cubs and the New York Yankees, they broke the MLB strikeout record as both teams combined made 48 strikeouts (Yankees 22 and Cubs 26). In addition, the 18-inning game was also the longest interleague game yet in MLB history and longest Sunday Night Baseball game yet broadcast. The Yankees won, 5–4.

On August 12, 2018, during a game between the Washington Nationals and the Chicago Cubs, David Bote hit a pinch-hit walk-off grand slam with his team down 3–0 and down to their final strike to give the Cubs a stunning 4–3 victory.

2020s
As previously mentioned, on August 8, 2021, the Sunday Night Baseball game between the Chicago White Sox and the Chicago Cubs aired exclusively on ABC. It was the first time since 1995 that a regular season Major League Baseball game aired on ABC. White Sox won the game 9–3.

Features

The telecasts also utilize the K Zone, a computer-generated on-screen graphic that accurately outlines the strike zone and pitch location. A Skycam is also used; it is usually mounted 20 feet above the stands in foul territory and travels back and forth along the first base line from behind home plate to the foul pole.

Commentators
A complete list of broadcasters, with their period of tenure on the show (beginning years of each season shown).

Current
 Karl Ravech: (play-by-play, 2022–present)
 Jon Sciambi: (fill-in play-by-play, 2022–present)
 David Cone: (analyst, 2022–present)
 Eduardo Pérez: (analyst, 2022–present)
 Buster Olney: (field reporter, 2011–present)
 Tim Kurkjian: (fill-in field reporter, 2022–present)
 Michael Kay: (play-by-play for ESPN2 telecasts, 2022–present)
 Alex Rodriguez: (analyst for ESPN telecasts, 2018–2021; analyst for ESPN2 telecasts, 2022–present)

Former

Play-by-play commentators
 Jon Miller: (play-by-play, 1990–2010)
 Dan Shulman: (play-by-play, 2011–2017)
 Matt Vasgersian: (play-by-play, 2018–2021)

Booth analysts
 Joe Morgan: (analyst, 1990–2010)
 Steve Phillips: (analyst, 2009)
 Orel Hershiser: (analyst, 2010–2013)
 Bobby Valentine: (analyst, 2011)
 Terry Francona: (analyst, 2012)
 John Kruk: (analyst, 2013–2016)
 Curt Schilling: (analyst, 2014–2015)
 Jessica Mendoza: (analyst, 2015–2019)
 Aaron Boone: (analyst, 2016–2017)
 Alex Rodriguez: (analyst, 2018–2021)

Field reporters
 Álvaro Martin: (field reporter, 2000–2001)
 Sam Ryan: (field reporter, 2004–2006)
 Bonnie Bernstein: (field reporter, July–September 2006)
 Peter Gammons: (field analyst, 2006–2008)
 Wendi Nix: (field reporter, 2011)

Other networksESPN Domingo de Grandes Ligas (Major League Sunday) is also broadcast in Spanish on ESPN Deportes, with Ernesto Jerez on play-by-play and Luis Alfredo Alvarez as the color analyst. This version is also presented on the Spanish feed of ESPN Latin America. The Brazilian feed, in Portuguese, has Romulo Mendonça doing the play-by-play and Paulo Antunes as the analyst. They broadcast from ESPN Brasil studios in São Paulo.

ESPN Radio has aired a weekly Sunday Night Baseball broadcast since 1998. Currently, Jon Sciambi calls play-by-play of the games, with Chris Singleton serving as color analyst. Sciambi was preceded by Gary Thorne (2008–09), Dan Shulman (2002–07), and Charley Steiner (1998–2001), while Singleton was preceded by Dave Campbell (1999–2010) and Kevin Kennedy (1998). As of 2020, the reserves for Sciambi include Shulman and Roxy Bernstein. In Canada, this program airs on CJCL, the flagship sports radio station for Sportsnet. TUDN Radio also airs Sunday Night Baseball in Spanish, after the dissolution of ESPN Deportes Radio.

From 1990 to 1997, CBS Radio aired Sunday night games, usually with Jerry Coleman and John Rooney announcing.

Outside the US, this weekly game was also broadcast live on Five in the UK from 1997 until 2008 and at the time was the longest running programme on the channel. In Latin America the game is broadcast on ESPN Latin America. When the NFL season begins, the game is moved to ESPN Dos only for the audience in Mexico, Central America, Venezuela, Colombia and the Caribbean Islands.

In Canada, Sunday Night Baseball has aired on the TSN family of channels (usually on TSN2) since May 16, 2010. This was initially under a sublicensing agreement with Sportsnet, the primary Canadian rightsholder for Major League Baseball, in a deal through which TSN transferred its remaining rights to Toronto Blue Jays games to Sportsnet, which is now the exclusive carrier of Blue Jays games, and English-language rightsholder of all post-season games. Beginning in 2014, TSN has contracted directly with MLB for rights to SNB and other ESPN MLB telecasts through 2021. Sportsnet may still air individual games in the event of a scheduling conflict between all of TSN's channels. Previous carriers of Sunday Night Baseball'' were TSN (1990–2000), The Score (2001–2002), and Sportsnet (2003 – May 9, 2010). In French, the program is carried on Réseau des Sports with Alain Usereau and Marc Griffin working as the announcers.

Notes

References

References
 USA Today- Gammons to join Sunday Night Baseball
 
 ESPN.tv

External links
 Baseball on ESPN.tv
 Searchable Network TV Broadcasts

2000s American television series
2010s American television series
2020s American television series
ESPN original programming
Major League Baseball on television
ESPN Radio programs
Major League Baseball on the radio
American sports television series
1990 American television series debuts
Sunday mass media